Sphallopterus batesi is a species of beetle in the family Cerambycidae, the only species in the genus Sphallopterus.

References

Cerambycini